"When We're Old" (Lithuanian: Kol myliu) is a song performed by Lithuanian singer Ieva Zasimauskaitė and written by Vytautas Bikus. The song was released as a digital download on 13 February 2018.

Eurovision Song Contest

It represented Lithuania in the Eurovision Song Contest 2018 after winning "Eurovizijos" dainų konkurso nacionalinė atranka. The song competed in the first semi-final, held on 8 May 2018 in Lisbon, Portugal and was one of the ten qualifiers of the night. The song finished 12th  with 181 points at the grand final,  including 91 points from televote (10th place) and 90 points from the juries (11th place).

Track listing

Charts

Release history

References

Eurovision songs of Lithuania
Eurovision songs of 2018
2018 songs
2018 singles
Songs about old age
Pop ballads
2010s ballads
Lithuanian songs